Weverson Leandro Oliveira Moura (born 12 May 1993), more commonly known as Leandro, is a Brazilian footballer who plays for Japanese club FC Tokyo as a winger or a forward.

Club career
Born in Brasília, Distrito Federal, Leandro joined Grêmio's youth setup in May 2010, after impressing with Gama. He was promoted to the main squad in January of the following year, he made his senior debut on 20 February 2011, coming on as a late substitute for Fábio Rochemback and scoring the last in a 5–0 home routing of Ypiranga.

Leandro signed a five-year deal with Tricolor immediately after his 18th birthday, and made his Série A debut on 22 May, starting in a 1–2 home loss against Corinthians. On 3 August he scored his first top flight goal, netting the first in a 2–2 draw against Atlético Mineiro also at the Estádio Olímpico Monumental.

On 14 February 2013 Leandro signed a one-year loan deal with Palmeiras, along with Vilson and Léo Gago and with Hernán Barcos moving in the opposite way. He made his debut for the club seven days later, scoring the game's in a home success over União Barbarense.

Leandro scored 13 league goals in 30 appearances, helping Verdão return to the main category at first attempt. On 10 January 2014, he signed a four-year permanent deal with the club, for a €5 million fee.

On 3 August 2015 Leandro was loaned to Santos, until December.

On 2 February 2016 Leandro was loaned to Coritiba.

In 2017 Leandro was loaned to Kashima Antlers.

International career
Leandro has represented Brazil in the 2011 Pan American Games, and also featured with the under-20s in 2013 South American Youth Football Championship. On 2 April 2013, Leandro was called up by Felipão for the main squad to play a friendly against Bolivia; he made his full international debut four days later, replacing Ronaldinho Gaúcho and scoring the last in a 4–0 away win.

Career statistics

Club

International

International goals
Scores and results list Brazil's goal tally first.

Honours

Club
Palmeiras
Copa do Brasil: 2015
Campeonato Brasileiro Série B: 2013

Kashima Antlers
AFC Champions League: 2018
Japanese Super Cup: 2017

FC Tokyo
J.League Cup: 2020

International
Brazil U20
Toulon Tournament: 2014

Individual
 J.League Cup MVP: 2020

References

External links

1993 births
Living people
Footballers from Brasília
Brazilian footballers
Association football forwards
Campeonato Brasileiro Série A players
Campeonato Brasileiro Série B players
Grêmio Foot-Ball Porto Alegrense players
Sociedade Esportiva Palmeiras players
Santos FC players
Kashima Antlers players
FC Tokyo players
Footballers at the 2011 Pan American Games
Brazil youth international footballers
Brazil international footballers
Pan American Games competitors for Brazil